Bihor County is a county (județ) in western Romania. Its capital city is Oradea.

Toponymy
The origin of the name Bihor is uncertain, except that it likely takes its name from an ancient fortress in the current commune of Biharia. It possibly came from  vihor, the Serbian and Ukrainian word for "whirlwind" (вихор), or Slavic  biela hora, meaning "white mountain".  Another theory is that Biharea is of Daco-Thracian etymology (bi meaning "two" and harati "take" or "lead"), possibly meaning two possessions of land in the Duchy of Menumorut. Another theory is that the name comes from bour, the Romanian term for aurochs (from the Latin word bubalus). The animal once inhabited the lands of northwestern Romania. Under this controversial theory, the name changed from buar to buhar and to Bihar and Bihor.

Demographics 

By religion 

99.4% of the county's population are Christian and of these:

 Romanian Orthodox – 59.7%
 Reformed – 18.1%; 
 Catholic – 11.5% (Roman Catholic – 9.2%; Greek Catholic – 2.3%)
 Pentecostal – 5.7%; 
 Baptists – 3.7%; 
 Adventist – 0.3%;

Geography
 
The heights decrease westwards, passing through the hills an ending in the Romanian Western Plain – the eastern side of the Pannonian plain.

The county is mainly the Criș hydrographic basin with the rivers Crișul Repede, Crișul Negru, and Barcău the main rivers.

Neighbours

 Sălaj County, Cluj County, and Alba County in the East.
 Hungary in the West – Hajdú-Bihar County and Békés County
 Satu Mare County in the North.
 Arad County in the South.

History
Prior to World War I, the territory of the county belonged to Austria-Hungary and mostly was contained in the Bihar County of the Kingdom of Hungary. The territory of Bihor County was transferred to Romania from Hungary as successor state to Austria-Hungary in 1920 under the Treaty of Trianon. After the administrative unification law in 1925, the name of the county remained as it was, but the territory was reorganized.

In 1938, King Carol II promulgated a new Constitution, and subsequently he had the administrative division of the Romanian territory changed. 10 ținuturi (approximate translation: "lands") were created (by merging the counties) to be ruled by rezidenți regali (approximate translation: "Royal Residents") - appointed directly by the King - instead of the prefects. Bihor County became part of Ținutul Crișuri.

In 1940, part of the county was transferred back to Hungary with the rest of Northern Transylvania under the Second Vienna Award. Beginning in 1944, Romanian forces with Soviet assistance recaptured the ceded territory and reintegrated it into Romania. Romanian jurisdiction over the entire county per the Treaty of Trianon was reaffirmed in the Paris Peace Treaties, 1947. The county was disestablished by the communist government of Romania in 1950, and re-established in 1968 when Romania restored the county administrative system.

Economy

Bihor is one of the wealthiest counties in Romania, with a GDP per capita well above the national average. Recently, the economy has been driven by a number of construction projects. Bihor has the lowest unemployment rate in Romania and among the lowest in Europe, with only 2.4% unemployment, compared to Romania's average of 5.1%.

The predominant industries in the county are:
 Textile industry.
 Food and beverages industry.
 Mechanical components industry.
 Metallurgy.

In the west side of the county there are mines for extracting coal and bauxite. Crude oil is also extracted.

Tourism
The main tourist attractions in the county are:
 The city of Oradea.
 The Apuseni Mountains:
 The Stâna de Vale Resort and the Iada valley.
 The Caves around Padiș and on the Sighiștel River Valley.
 The Bear's Cave.
 Băile Felix Resort.

Coat of arms

The coat of arms of Bihor County was adopted in 1998, and is a quarterly shield featuring a castle (for the Castle of Bihar), five wheat stalks with a ribbon, and a scroll with the text of Deșteaptă-te, române!, covered with a fess featuring three fish. It was subject to redesign in 2013 after it was discovered by a local teacher that the text on the scroll was erroneously written in Greek, rather than Cyrillic (the original alphabet used to write the poem's text) or the Latin alphabet. The county has no significant history with Greece.

Politics 

The Bihor County Council, renewed at the 2020 local elections, consists of 34 counsellors, with the following party composition:

Administrative divisions

Bihor County has four municipalities, six towns, and 91 communes.

Municipalities
Beiuș
Marghita
Oradea – capital city; 196,367 (as of 2011)
Salonta
Towns
Aleșd
Nucet
Săcueni
Ștei
Valea lui Mihai
Vașcău
Communes

Historical county

Administration
The territory of the county was divided into eleven districts (plăși)
Plasa Aleşd (comprising 41 villages, headquartered at Aleşd)
Plasa Beiuș (comprising 62 villages, headquartered at Beiuș)
Plasa Beliu (comprising 30 villages, headquartered at Beliu)
Plasa Ceica (comprising 47 villages, headquartered at Ceica)
Plasa Centrală (comprising 40 villages, headquartered at Oradea)
Plasa Marghita (comprising 43 villages, headquartered at Marghita)
Plasa Săcueni (comprising 11 villages, headquartered at Săcueni)
Plasa Sălard (comprising 28 villages, headquartered at Sălard)
Plasa Tileagd (comprising 28 villages, headquartered at Tileagd)
Plasa Tinca (comprising 26 villages, headquartered at Tinca)
Plasă Vașcău (comprising 44 villages, headquartered at Vașcău)

Within Bihor County there were three urban localities: Oradea (also known as Oradea Mare, the county seat) and urban communes Salonta and Beiuş.

Population 
According to the 1930 census data, the county population was 510,318, ethnically divided among Romanians (61.6%), Hungarians (30.0%), Jews (4.3%), Czechs and Slovaks (2.2%), as well as other minorities. By language the county was divided among Romanian (61.4%), Hungarian (33.8%), Czech (2.0%), Yiddish (1.5%), as well as other minorities. From the religious point of view, the population consisted of Eastern Orthodox (49.8%), Reformed (21.0%), Greek Catholics (10.7%), Roman Catholics (10.4%), Jews (5.4%), Baptists (2.2%), as well as other minorities.

Urban population 
The county's urban population consisted of 102,277 inhabitants, 54.8% Hungarians, 26.4% Romanians, 15.4% Jews, 1% Germans, as well as other minorities. As a mother tongue in the urban population, Hungarian (67.9%) predominated, followed by Romanian (24.9%), Yiddish (4.3%), German (1.2%) as well as other minorities. From the religious point of view, the urban population consisted of 31.5% Reformed, 20.6% Jewish, 19.3% Roman Catholic, 17.5% Eastern Orthodox, 9.1% Greek Catholic, 1.1% Lutheran, as well as other minorities.

References 

Bihor County
Counties of Romania
Hungarian communities in Romania
1925 establishments in Romania
1938 disestablishments in Romania
States and territories disestablished in 1938
States and territories established in 1925
1940 establishments in Romania
1950 disestablishments in Romania
1968 establishments in Romania
States and territories established in 1940
States and territories disestablished in 1950
States and territories established in 1968